Emmenbrücke Kapf railway station is a railway station in the municipality of Emmen, in the Swiss canton of Lucerne. It is an intermediate stop on the standard gauge Olten–Lucerne line of Swiss Federal Railways. Until the December 2022 timetable change, the station was named Rothenburg Dorf, after the nearby municipality of Rothenburg.

Services 
 the following services stop at Emmenbrücke Kapf:

References

External links 
 
 

Railway stations in the canton of Lucerne
Swiss Federal Railways stations